The 1968 Milan–San Remo was the 59th edition of the Milan–San Remo cycle race and was held on 19 March 1968. The race started in Milan and finished in San Remo. The race was won by Rudi Altig of the Salvarani team.

General classification

References

1968
1968 in road cycling
1968 in Italian sport
1968 Super Prestige Pernod